The Jizzakh Higher Military Aviation School is the military academy of the Uzbek Air Force, located in the city of Qarshi. It is one of 8 military colleges in Uzbekistan.

History
On 18 March 1994, by order of President Islam Karimov and the Cabinet of Ministers, the construction of school was initiated. The school was opened that September. The schools is responsible for preparing highly qualified military personnel with advanced knowledge and specialties. On 19 June 2019, it was announced that the school would move to Qarshi on 1 September to improve the system of professional military training. The new building is located on Khonabad airfield, on the basis of the former Karshi Sergeant Training School. The new school received an Isuzu bus and a Ravon Gentra as a gift from President Shavkat Mirziyoyev.

Training
The school trains officers in the following specialties:
Pilot-engineer on airplanes and helicopters
Personnel officer
Navigator and combat command officer
Aircraft technician
Aviation technician

The training of cadets consists of theoretical and flight training and is carried out in stages. Flight training consists of performing test flights with instructor pilots and independent flights. The total flight time during training is 180 hours. The specialization of pilots for a specific aircraft occurs in aviation units after graduation from school.

In 2017, foreign language cadets of the school took part in the International Cadet Olympiad of the Russian Defence Ministry in Yerevan.  Many pilots of the Tajik Air Force are trained in the school. In early 2020, a delegation from the Aviation Department of the Military Institute of the Ministry of Defense of Tajikistan visited the Higher Military Aviation School.

References

Qashqadaryo Region
1994 establishments in Uzbekistan
Military academies of Uzbekistan